Namps-Maisnil is a commune in the Somme department in Hauts-de-France in northern France.

Geography
A commune created by the amalgamation, in 1972, of the four old communes of Namps-au-Mont, Namps-au-Val, Rumaisnil and Taisnil. Namps-Quevauvillers station has rail connections to Amiens and Abancourt.

Population

Places of interest
 The war memorial at Taisnil
 The church at Namps-au-Val
 The Château of Namps-au-Mont

See also
Communes of the Somme department

References

Communes of Somme (department)